Dennis Gjengaar is a Norwegian professional footballer who plays as a full-back or winger for Odd.

External links
 
 
 Odd.no

2004 births
Living people
People from Horten
Norwegian footballers
Association football fullbacks
Association football wingers
Norway youth international footballers
Eliteserien players
FK Ørn-Horten players
Odds BK players